The 1960–61 season was the 15th season in FK Partizan's existence. This article shows player statistics and matches that the club played during the 1960–61 season.

Players

Squad information
player (league matches/league goals)Tomislav Kaloperović (22/7)Milutin Šoškić (22/0) (goalkeeper)Velibor Vasović (22/1)Fahrudin Jusufi (22/0)Milan Galić (21/14)Milan Vukelić (20/8)Joakim Vislavski (20/5)Vladica Kovačević (18/4)Lazar Radović (17/3)Jovan Miladinović (16/2)Branislav Mihajlović (12/5)Aleksandar Jončić (11/0)Velimir Sombolac (9/0)Bora Milutinović (6/2)Bruno Belin (5/0)Ilija Mitić (5/0)Božidar Pajević (5/0)Milorad Milutinović (2/0)Miodrag Petrović (1/0)Dragomir Slišković (1/0)

Friendlies

Competitions

Yugoslav First League

Yugoslav Cup

Statistics

Goalscorers 
This includes all competitive matches.

Score overview

See also
 List of FK Partizan seasons

References

External links
 Official website
 Partizanopedia 1960-61  (in Serbian)

FK Partizan seasons
Partizan
Yugoslav football championship-winning seasons